Gene Pitney's Big Sixteen is American singer Gene Pitney's seventh album, released on the Musicor label in 1964. The album contains a mix of hit singles and album cuts from Pitney's early records.

Track listing

Side 1
"Ship True Love Goodbye" (Mark Barkan, Neval Nader) – 2:25 (from Gene Pitney Sings Just for You)
"Twenty Four Hours From Tulsa" (Hal David, Burt Bacharach) – 3:00 (from Blue Gene)
"Only Love Can Break a Heart" (David, Bacharach) – 2:49 (from Only Love Can Break a Heart)
"Not Responsible" (Ben Raleigh, Barkan) – 2:31 (from Gene Pitney Sings Just for You) 
"Teardrop by Teardrop" (Bob Halley) – 2:19 (from Gene Pitney Sings Just for You)
"Donna Means Heartbreak" (David, Paul Hampton) – 2:23 (from Only Love Can Break a Heart) 
"Aladdin's Lamp" (Gene Pitney) – 2:28 (from Gene Pitney Sings Just for You)
"The Man Who Shot Liberty Valance" (David, Bacharach) – 2:58 (from Only Love Can Break a Heart)

Side 2
"Keep Tellin' Yourself" (Ellie Greenwich, Elmo Glick, Tony Powers) – 2:23 (from Blue Gene)
"Mecca" (John Gluck, Jr., Nader) – 2:21 (from Gene Pitney Sings Just for You)
"Town Without Pity" (Dimitri Tiomkin, Ned Washington) – 2:55 (from The Many Sides of Gene Pitney)
"Tower Tall" (Mel Mandel, Norman Sachs) – 3:21 (from Only Love Can Break a Heart) 
"Cry Your Eyes Out" (Raleigh, J. Gluck) – 2:04 (from Only Love Can Break a Heart) 
"True Love Never Runs Smooth" (David, Bacharach) – 2:26 (from Only Love Can Break a Heart) 
"Take Me Tonight" (Aaron Schroeder, Roy Alfred, Wally Gold) – 2:37 (from The Many Sides of Gene Pitney)
"Half Heaven – Half Heartache" (Schroeder, George Goehring, Gold)– 2:43 (from Only Love Can Break a Heart)

References

1964 albums
Gene Pitney albums
Musicor Records albums